"Machine Gun" is a song by English band Portishead. The song made its radio and download debut on 24 March 2008, acting as the lead single from their third studio album, Third (2008). It premiered on Zane Lowe's BBC Radio 1 show and was made available for download on the band's official website. A UK one-sided 12 inch vinyl was released on 14 April 2008.

Release
The 12-inch vinyl was released on 14 April, while a digital version was made available from the official site on 10 April. A music video for the song was released. It features the band playing the song at the studio. On 29 May, during the first concert at the Estrella Damm Primavera Sound Festival in Barcelona, Chuck D of Public Enemy joined the band onstage to perform a rap section on the instrumental part at the end of the song.

The song's beat was sampled by The Weeknd on his song "Belong to the World" from his debut album Kiss Land. According to Geoff Barrow, the sample was used without the band's permission.

Track listing
"Machine Gun" – 4:45

In popular culture
A different version of the song appeared in the teaser for the video game Metro: Last Light.
The song was featured in an episode of the British teen drama Skins, which is set in Bristol, where the band is from.
The song was used in the credit sequence of "Well This Took a Dark Turn", a season 6 episode of the Netflix series Orange Is the New Black.
The song was also featured at the end of Netflix Italian drama Curon as a closure with the lyrics depicting some instances of the plot of the series.

Charts
"Machine Gun" entered the UK Singles Chart at number 52 on 30 March 2008, their first singles chart entry for ten years since "Only You" in March 1998.

References

External links
Machine Gun vinyl 12-inch edition at Discogs.

2008 singles
Portishead (band) songs
Songs written by Geoff Barrow
Songs written by Beth Gibbons
2008 songs